Béliers de Kemper (in English: Quimper Rams), known before the 2020–21 season as UJAP Quimper 29, is a French basketball club based in Quimper. The home arena of the club is the OS Michel Gloaguen, which has a  capacity of 2,049. The club currently plays in the LNB Pro B, the second highest level league of France.

History 

In 1984, the two auspices of Quimper fusion ; the Jeanne d'Arc and the Phalange d'Arvor, which gives birth the Union Jeanne d'Arc Phalange Quimper. L’UJAP was, at the beginning of the 1990s, the biggest club of France in term of college graduates (about 550).

On 23 June 2020, the club announced a renaming to Béliers de Kemper.

Club honors 

NM1
Winners (1): 2002–03 
Pro B  
Runners-up (1): 2006–07

Notable players

 Miguel Cardoso
 Valdelício Joaquim
 Matthew Wright

References

External links
 Official website
 website

Basketball teams established in 1984
Beliers
Beliers